Southern Belles is a 2005 comedy film directed by Paul S. Myers and Brennan Shroff.
This is a story of two best friends who live in the fictitious small town of Johnson's Mark, Georgia. Dreaming of a fresh start in Atlanta they soon learn it will be very difficult to make their way there on their small town budget. There are many references to the literary history of the State of Georgia including Gone With the Wind.

Cast
Anna Faris as Belle Scott
Laura Breckenridge as Bell Granger
Justin Chambers as Rhett Butler
Heather Goldenhersh as Margery
Judah Friedlander as Duane
Fred Weller as Tracy Hampton
Zac Gardner as Kevin
Tammy Arnold as Jane Willard
Craig Myers as Captain Willard

External links
Official site

2005 films
2005 comedy films
Films shot in North Carolina
Films set in Georgia (U.S. state)
American comedy films
2000s English-language films
2000s American films